Nana Asare is the name of:

Nana Akwasi Asare (born 1986), Ghanaian footballer
Isaac Nana Asare (born 1994), Ghanaian footballer